Bhojpuri music is a form of Hindustani Classical Music and includes a broad array of Bhojpuri language performances in distinct style, both traditional and modern. This form of music is mostly created in Indian states of Bihar, Uttar Pradesh and other countries like Nepal, Trinidad and Tobago, Suriname, Guyana, Netherlands, Mauritius and other Caribbean Islands.

History 
Origin of Bhojpuri music is quite unclear but the earliest form of Bhojpuri music song today is Nirguna was used to be sung by Kabir. Earlier on event occasions like Chhath or wedding these folks songs were used to be sung by people. 

When Bhojpuriyas were taken as plantation workers in British colonies, globalisation of Bhojpuri music took place and it extended its radius in counties like Mauritius, Netherlands and Caribbean Islands. It also mixed with the folk or modern music form of that countries and this leads to the birth of a different form of Bhojpuri music like Baithak Gana in Suriname, Chutney music in Trinidad and Tobago and Geet Gawai in Mauritius.

The modern form of Bhojpuri music generated from Bollywood movies of 1950s. Later after the release of the first Bhojpuri Film Ganga Maiyya Tohe Piyari Chadhaibo the modernisation of Bhojpuri folk songs happened along with a generation of Modern Bhojpuri music.

Classification
Bhojpuri Folk music can be classified on several basis:

Occasional
These songs are sung on various occasions, events and religious rituals:

 Child Birth: Song that are sung on the birth of a child are called Sohar.
Mundan : These are sung during Mundan.
 Marriage : There are several different songs that are sung in the different marriage rituals.

Caste based

Different caste in Bhojpuri region have their own folk songs. Biraha belongs to the Ahir or Yadav caste, Pachara songs belong to Dusadh, Kaharwa to Kanhars and so on.

Season based 
Many songs are sung in  a particular season or month like Kajari in Sawan, Phaguwa in Phalguna etc.

Traditional music 
The traditional music of Bhojpuri is either sung is special occasions like weddings, child Birth, festivals or in every month of Vikram Samvat.

 Biraha : The word Biraha is derived from the Sanskrit word virah which means separation. Birha is a lengthy narrative tale which is sung to a series of melodic fragments.
Kajari : Kajari is sung during the season of Monsoon or in the month of Sawan.
Nirbani : These songs are sung on the occasion of Marriage by Chamar women.
Sohar : This song is sung in the occasion of Child Birth.

Modern music

Modernisation of Bhojpuri Music started with Bollywood songs like Nain Lad Jaihe.

Famous songs 

 Arrah Hile Chhapra Hile Baliya Hilela
 Bambai Main Ka Ba
 Kaise Bani

References 

Nepalese music
Bihar
Bhojpuri-language culture
Indian styles of music